UrgentRx is an American pharmaceutical manufacturer. It is headquartered in Denver, Colorado and was founded in 2010 by serial entrepreneur and consumer product executive Jordan Eisenberg.

UrgentRx makes a line of single-dose OTC medications that are flavored and powdered. The products can be taken without water and come in single-dose, credit card-sized packets. The company claims the powder acts faster than pills. UrgentRx was initially developed as a way for potential heart attack victims to carry aspirin with them. The company now makes medications for other ailments such as headaches, aches and pains, allergy attacks, heartburn, and upset stomach.

In July 2013 UrgentRx was named one of "The 25 Most Innovative Consumer And Retail Brands" by Forbes, and in February 2014 UrgentRx made an appearance on "The Doctors" TV show. In July 2013 UrgentRx named long-standing OTC vet Michael Valentino to the company's board. Valentino has 30+ years of experience working with both major pharmaceutical companies and venture-backed start-ups. 

In November 2015, UrgentRx was acquired by Synergy CHC Corporation.

References 

Health care companies established in 2010
Companies based in Denver
Pharmaceutical companies of the United States
2010 establishments in Colorado
Health care companies based in Colorado